The men's 4 × 100 metres relay event at the 1995 Summer Universiade was held on 2–3 September at the Hakatanomori Athletic Stadium in Fukuoka, Japan.

Medalists

* Athletes who competed in heats only.

Results

Heats
Qualification: First 3 teams of each heat (Q) plus the next 2 fastest (q) qualified for the final.

Final

References

Athletics at the 1995 Summer Universiade
1995